Irumbukkottai Murattu Singam is a 2010 Indian Tamil-language Western comedy film directed by Chimbu Deven, starring choreographer-turned-actor Raghava Lawrence, Padmapriya, Lakshmi Rai, and Sandhya alongside an ensemble supporting cast including Nassar, Sai Kumar, and M. S. Baskar. The film is a "western adventure comedy film" based on cowboy stories, which is set in the 19th century paying homages to many western films. The film's shooting commenced in April 2009 and was released on 7 May 2010 to mixed reviews. In Tamil cinema, after the movie Ganga (1972) starring Jaishankar, this is a full-length Western being taken after 38 years. The film comically highlights the current world politics.

Plot
The town of Jayshankarapuram, home of Tamil-speaking cowboys, is ruled by a one-eyed tyrant named Kizhakku Kattai (literally translating to East Wood as in Clint Eastwood), who rules over other villages as well, and is always surrounded by his assistants: a cowgirl named Pakki and an outlaw named Ulakkai. In order to free their town from Kattai's rule, Bilagiri James, Dagelandi, Jada, and Viruma travel to a neighboring town, Holaypuram, to seek out a savior.

There, they encounter Singaram, a man with a noble heart who has been sentenced to death for duty negligence. The gang saves Singaram from execution and explains their situation. Singaram learns why he was chosen. The brave Singam was the previous marshal of Jayashankarapuram who bore a striking resemblance to Singaram, and also was the only one who stood up to Kattai's tyranny. Singam disappeared under mysterious circumstances years ago, and the town was left defenseless.

Thus, Singaram is brought to the village and is passed off as Singam. Singaram learns to adapt to his new name, learning all the hero's skills and tricks. He wins the respect of the village seniors, which includes Paandu Paramu and Keluthi Amma. Soon, a girl named Baali falls for Singaram. He later surpasses the original hero's prowess, though initially, it is due to dumb luck. In between the hero's and the villain's camp is a Red Indian village where the tribals are pure vegetarians. With the introduction of this village, Athirikesa, the leader of the tribal group, his father Rangula, and his beautiful daughter Thumbi are also introduced.

The villagers at Jayashankarapuram find a map that is hidden in their "MGR Timesquare", but it is only one half they have. They have to find the other half to hunt for treasure that is preserved and hidden somewhere far away. Unfortunately, Kattai has other plans. He negotiates a deal of freeing prisoners in exchange of the treasure.  Singaram and the folks find the treasure in an Indiana Jones-esque adventure. They successfully find the treasure and escape the cave. But, it is revealed that Dagelandy is a right-hand man of Kattai, who was spying Singaram's gang all along. Kattai also reveals that he killed Singam a few years ago and challenges Singaaram to a duel in front of the people. While Kattai gains the upper hand initially, the thought of Singam's death in the hands of Kattai infuriates Singaram and he starts beating up Kattai. Kattai is eventually shot dead by Pakki, out of her love for Singaram and she leaves the place with her cronies. Peace prevails within Jayshankarpuram's inhabitants and the red Indians.

Singaram is hailed as a hero in Jayshankarapuram and is presented with a large diamond and a platter of gold coins of the treasure as a reward by the people. However, Singaram declines the gold coins for the diamond, instead asking the people to use the coins to build a school for the children, while stating that education is important and is to be imparted to all. He is given a heartful farewell by the people and rides off. On the way, Baali stops him saying that while he took the diamond, he was leaving his "life" behind. Singaram smiles and they both ride off in the sunset.

Cast

 Raghava Lawrence as Singam and Singaram
 Padmapriya as Baali
 Lakshmi Rai as Pakki
 Sandhya as Thumbi
 Nassar as Kizhakku Kattai
 Sai Kumar as Ulakkai
 M. S. Bhaskar as Athirikesa
 Senthil as Rangula Peri
 Mouli as Bilagiri James
 Ilavarasu as Dagelandi
 Ramesh Khanna as Jada
 Vaiyapuri as Viruma
 Delhi Ganesh as Paandu Paramu
 Manorama as Keluthi Amma
 Chams as Lee
 Mohan Raman as Sheriff
 Besant Ravi as Color Kathiresan
 V. S. Raghavan (cameo appearance) as an Old man in Jaishankar Puram

Cultural references
 The film features two fictional villages Jaishankarpuram and Ashokapuram which was named after Jaishankar and Ashokan who played the hero and villain in Ganga which was first of the Genere in India.
 In the court sequence you will find Amitabh Bachchan's portrait instead of Gandhi paying homage to Sholay.
 The antagonist's name, "Kilakku Kattai", literally translates to Eastwood, in reference to Clint Eastwood.
 During their journey to get the treasure they find an ID card which has Indiana Jones's name on it.
 In a sequence when the protagonist is explained about the village it said John Wayne and Clint Eastwood are founding fathers of this community.

Production
For the role of a cowboy, Raghava Lawrence grew his hair long and learnt horse riding and gunspinning.

Soundtrack
All the songs' lyrics were written by Vairamuthu.

Release & reception
The film was dubbed into Hindi by Goldmines Telefilms.

Sify wrote "Hats off in cowboy style to writer and director Chimbudevan for doing such good research and bringing about authenticity to his plot and acknowledging great western legendary films of the 60?s and 70?s. But if only he had worked out a better script, it would have been a great fun ride". Behindwoods wrote "Simbu Devan should certainly be applauded for giving the audience an all new experience and his hard work is palpable. On the flipside, he does not engage the audience completely and loses his grip on them on and off. There are times when the film appears outright childish. The screen play meanders a while and there is a jump of genre here and there".

References

External links
 
 Official website
 AGS Entertainment Website

2010 films
2010s Western (genre) comedy films
2010s parody films
Indian Western (genre) comedy films
2010s Tamil-language films
Films scored by G. V. Prakash Kumar
Indian parody films
Films directed by Chimbu Deven
2010 comedy films